Thaumastocoridae is a family of true bugs in the order Hemiptera. There are about 9 genera and more than 20 described species in the family Thaumastocoridae.

Genera
These nine genera belong to the family Thaumastocoridae:
 Baclozygum Bergroth, 1909
 Discocoris Kormilev, 1955
 Onymocoris Drake & Slater, 1957
 Proxylastodoris Heiss & Popov, 2002
 Thaumastocoris Kirkaldy, 1908
 Xylastodoris Barber, 1920
 † Paleodoris Poinar & Santiago-Blay, 1997 Dominican amber, Miocene
 † Protodoris Nel, Waller & De Ploëg, 2004 Oise amber, France, Ypresian
†Proxylastodoris Heiss and Popov, 2002 Baltic amber, Eocene
 † Thaumastotingis Heiss & Golub, 2015 Baltic amber, Eocene

References

Further reading

 
 
 
 

Cimicomorpha
Heteroptera families
Articles created by Qbugbot